Romagnano Sesia is a town and comune (municipality) of about 4,000 inhabitants in the Province of Novara in the Italian region Piedmont, located about  northeast of Turin and about  northwest of Novara.

Romagnano Sesia borders the following municipalities: Cavallirio, Fontaneto d'Agogna, Gattinara, Ghemme, Prato Sesia, and Serravalle Sesia.
Sights include the so-called "Cantina dei Santi" (Saints' cellar), which is a room which is the only remaining evidence of the ancient, powerful Benedictine monastery of S. Silano. The Cantina is completely painted with frescos dating back to the 15th century (Biblical story of David and King Saul).

References

External links
 Official website

 
Cities and towns in Piedmont